Pierre de Mirmande (fl. 1163–1203) was a French nobleman of the Order of Saint-John of Jerusalem from the end of the 12th century to the beginning of the 13th century. He served as interim Grand Master of the Knights Hospitaller after the death of Geoffroy de Donjon in 1202. He was replaced by Fernando Afonso of Portugal who became Grand Master in 1202.

Early life 
Before his entrance in the Order, Pierre de Mirmande was the Lord of Mirmande, near the village of Saint-Jean-Lachalm in the French department of Haute-Loire. He was married to a woman named Guillemette, and they had two sons Odon and Etienne. The French historian Augustin Chassaing wrote about Mirmande: "This is an interesting and very rare chance to meet the starting point in the West of an Hospitaller, called to command, thirty years later in the East, one of the most important places of war of the order."

Career 
The first mention of Pierre de Mirmande is in a charter dating from May 1163 when he entered the Order at the Saint John's commandery of Le Puy-en-Velay. We find him as a brother in 1184 in Saint-Jean-d'Acre under the magisterium of Roger de Moulins. According to acts of January 1193 and September 1199, he was Châtelain of the Krac des Chevaliers under the magisterium of Geoffroy de Donjon, elected around January 1193.

On 4 March 1202, De Mirmande was the Grand Commander of the Order, still under the magisterium of de Donjon who disappeared after the summer of 1202. The new grand master would be Fernando Afonso of Portugal, elected between the fall of 1202 and 1203. De Mirmande became the Grand Master ad interim and directed the Order in the East in his absence. Fernando Afonso joined his post during the year 1203.

It's in this context that on 23 March 1203, Pierre de Mirmande left on a diplomatic mission alongside Philippe du Plaissis, Grand Master of the Knights Templar and Soffredo Gaetani, legate of pope Innocent III. All three attempted mediation to resolve the war of succession between Bohemond IV and Raymond-Roupen concerning the Principality of Antioch.

See also

 Cartulaire général de l'Ordre des Hospitaliers
 List of Knights Hospitaller sites
 Langue (Knights Hospitaller)
 Flags of the Knights Hospitaller

References

Bibliography

External links
Pierre de Miramand. French Wikipedia.
Liste des grands maîtres de l'ordre de Saint-Jean de Jérusalem. French Wikipedia.
Eugène Harot, Essai d’armorial des Grands-Maîtres de l’Ordre de Saint Jean de Jérusalem.
Seals of the Grand Masters. Museum of the Order of St John.
Charles Moeller, Hospitallers of St. John of Jerusalem. Catholic Encyclopedia (1910). 7. New York: Robert Appleton Company.

Year of birth missing
Year of death missing
Knights Hospitaller
Grand Masters of the Knights Hospitaller
People from Haute-Loire
12th-century French people
13th-century French people